Old Theatre of Vilnius is a Russian-language theatre in Vilnius, the capital of Lithuania. Performances in it are mainly held in Russian (or in Russian with Lithuanian subtitles), as well as in Lithuanian.

It was established in 1864 by the actor of Alexandrinsky Theatre Pavel Vasilyev as Russian Drama Theatre. At that time it was the only theatre in Vilnius. During the Second World War, the theatre was disestablished and re-established in 1946.

Following the 2022 Russian invasion of Ukraine, the theatre was renamed the Old Theatre of Vilnius.

References

External links 
Official website

1864 establishments in the Russian Empire
Organizations established in 1864
Theatres in Vilnius